Will Davies-King (born 28 July 1998) is a Welsh rugby union player who plays for Cardiff Rugby as a prop. He was a Wales under-20 international despite being born in England.

Davies-King made his debut for the Cardiff team in 2019 having previously played for the Cardiff academy and Cardiff RFC.

References

External links 
Cardiff Rugby profile

1998 births
Living people
Cardiff Rugby players
Rugby union players from Reading, Berkshire
Rugby union props
Welsh rugby union players